Ward LeRoy Churchill (born 1947) is an American author and political activist. He was a professor of ethnic studies at the University of Colorado Boulder from 1990 until 2007. The primary focus of his work is on the historical treatment of political dissenters and Native Americans by the United States government. His work features controversial views, written in a direct, often confrontational style. While Churchill has claimed Native American ancestry, genealogical research has failed to unearth such ancestry and he is not a member of a tribe.

In January 2005, Churchill's 2001 essay "On the Justice of Roosting Chickens" gained attention. In the work, he argued the September 11 attacks were a natural and unavoidable consequence of unlawful U.S. foreign policy over the latter half of the 20th century; the essay is known for Churchill's use of the phrase "little Eichmanns" to describe the "technocratic corps" working in the World Trade Center.

In March 2005, the University of Colorado began investigating allegations that Churchill had engaged in research misconduct. Churchill was fired on July 24, 2007. Churchill filed a lawsuit against the University of Colorado for unlawful termination of employment. In April 2009 a Denver jury found that Churchill was unjustly fired, awarding him $1 in damages. In July 2009, however, a District Court judge vacated the monetary award and declined Churchill's request to order his reinstatement, holding that the university had "quasi-judicial immunity". Churchill's appeals of this decision were unsuccessful.

Early life and education
Churchill was born in Urbana, Illinois, to Jack LeRoy Churchill and Maralyn Lucretia Allen.  His parents divorced before he was two, and he grew up in Elmwood, where he attended local schools.

In 1966, he was drafted into the United States Army. On his 1980 resume, he claimed to have served as a public-information specialist who "wrote and edited the battalion newsletter and wrote news releases." In a 1987 profile in the Denver Post, Churchill claimed to have attended paratrooper school, and volunteered for a 10-month stint on Long Range Reconnaissance Patrol in Vietnam. Churchill also claimed to have spent time at the Chicago office of the Students for a Democratic Society (SDS), and provided firearms and explosives training to members of the Weather Underground.

In 2005, the Denver Post reported on fabrications in Churchill's service record. Department of Defense personnel files showed that Churchill was trained as a film projectionist and light truck driver, but they do not reflect paratrooper school or LRRP training.

Churchill received his B.A. in technological communications in 1974 and M.A. in communications theory in 1975, both from Sangamon State University (now the University of Illinois at Springfield).

Career

Teaching
In 1978, Churchill began working at the University of Colorado Boulder as an affirmative action officer in the university administration. He also lectured on issues relating to Native Americans in the United States in the ethnic studies program. In 1990, the University of Colorado hired him as an associate professor, although he did not possess the academic doctorate usually required for the position. The following year he was granted tenure in the Communications department, without the usual six-year probationary period, after having been declined by the Sociology and Political Science departments.

Churchill has long been interested in issues associated with the Dawes Act, which broke up the communal reservation lands and assigned plots to individual households.  Connected with that was the federal government's first use of "blood quantum" to define individual membership in tribes, for what became known as the Dawes Rolls. Since re-establishing self-governments, federally recognized tribes have established their own criteria for enrollment as members, often related to descent from recognized historical lists, but less often requiring proofs of blood quantum.  Some of his published works address these issues, which he has interpreted as part of the federal government's policy of genocide against Native Americans.

In 1994, then CU-Boulder Chancellor James Corbridge refused to take action on allegations that Churchill was fraudulently claiming to be an Indian, saying "it has always been university policy that a person's race or ethnicity is self-proving."

In 1996, Churchill moved to the new Ethnic Studies Department of the University of Colorado.  In 1997, he was promoted to full professor.  He was selected as chairman of the department in June 2002. Documents in Churchill's university personnel file show that Churchill was granted tenure in a "special opportunity position".

In January 2005, during the controversy over his 9/11 remarks, Churchill resigned as chairman of the ethnic studies department at the University of Colorado — his term as chair was scheduled to expire in June of that year.

In 2005, the University of Colorado's Research Misconduct Committee conducted a preliminary investigation into whether Churchill misrepresented his ethnicity to "add credibility and public acceptance to his scholarship". The committee concluded that the allegation was not "appropriate for further investigation under the definition of research misconduct". The university has said that it does not hire on the basis of ethnicity.

On May 16, 2006, the Investigative Committee of the Standing Committee on Research Misconduct at the University of Colorado concluded that Churchill had committed multiple counts of academic misconduct, specifically plagiarism, fabrication, and falsification. On July 24, 2007, Churchill was fired for academic misconduct in an eight to one vote by the University of Colorado's Board of Regents.

Research misconduct investigation

The controversy attracted increased academic scrutiny of Churchill's research, the quality of which had already been seriously questioned by the legal scholar John LaVelle and historian Guenter Lewy. Additional critics were the sociologist Thomas Brown, who had been preparing an article on Churchill's work, and the historians R. G. Robertson and Russell Thornton, who said that Churchill had misrepresented their work.  In 2005, University of Colorado Boulder administrators ordered an investigation into seven allegations of research misconduct, including three allegations of plagiarism, and four allegations of fabrication or falsification regarding the history of the Dawes Act, the Indian Arts and Crafts Act of 1990, and repeated claims that smallpox was intentionally spread to Native Americans by John Smith in 1614 and by the United States Army at Fort Clark in 1837.

On May 16, 2006, the university released its findings; the Investigative Committee unanimously concluded that Churchill had engaged in "serious research misconduct", including falsification, fabrication, and two of the three allegations of plagiarism. The committee was divided on the appropriate level of sanctions.  The Standing Committee on Research Misconduct accepted the findings of the Investigative Committee but also disagreed on what sanctions should be imposed. Churchill's appeal against his proposed dismissal was considered by a panel of the university's Privilege and Tenure Committee, which found that two of the seven findings of misconduct did not constitute dismissible offenses. Three members recommended that the penalty should be demotion and one year's suspension without pay, while two favored dismissal.

On July 24, 2007, the university regents voted seven to two to uphold all seven of the findings of research misconduct, overruling the recommendation of Privilege and Tenure panel that two be dismissed.  The regents voted eight to one to fire Churchill.

The next day, Churchill filed a lawsuit in state court claiming that the firing was retribution for his expressing politically unpopular views. The jury in Churchill's suit for reinstatement weighed the university's claims of academic misconduct per jury instructions it received in the case. On April 1, 2009, the  jury found that Churchill had been wrongly fired, and awarded $1 in damages.

On July 7, 2009, Judge Naves found that the defendants (university) were entitled to quasi-judicial immunity as a matter of law, vacated the jury verdict and determined that the university did not owe Churchill any financial compensation. Churchill appealed, but Judge Naves's decision was upheld by a three-judge panel of the Colorado Court of Appeals and by the Colorado Supreme Court.
 On April 1, 2013, the United States Supreme Court declined to hear Churchill's case.

A report by the Colorado Committee to Protect Faculty Rights of the Colorado Conference of the American Association of University Professors investigating academic freedom at the University of Colorado - Boulder determined that Ward Churchill's termination was unjustified.

Writing

Churchill has written on American Indian history and culture, and the genocide inflicted on the indigenous people of the Americas by European-American settlers and the ongoing repression of native peoples.

According to the University of Colorado investigation, Churchill's academic publications "are nearly all works of synthesis and reinterpretation, drawing upon studies by other scholars, not monographs describing new research based on primary sources." The investigation also noted that "he has decided to publish largely in alternative presses or journals, not in the university presses or mainstream peer-reviewed journals often favored by more conventional academics." Historian Gavriel Rosenfeld criticized Churchill for "numerous errors reflecting sloppy or hasty scholarship".

In 1986, Churchill wrote the "Pacifism as Pathology: Notes on an American Pseudopraxis" criticizing pacifist politics within the U.S. left as being hypocritical, de facto racist and ineffectual. In 1998, Arbeiter Ring Publishing published the essay in a book entitled Pacifism as Pathology: Reflections on the Role of Armed Struggle in North America, listing Ward Churchill as the author. The book included a preface by Ed Mead (of the George Jackson Brigade), a new introduction to the essay by Churchill and a commentary by Michael Ryan. The book sparked much debate in leftist circles and inspired more aggressive tactics within the anti-globalization movement in the following few years. George Lakey, a co-founder of the pacifist Movement for a New Society, published a detailed response in 2001 titled "Nonviolent Action as the Sword that Heals: Challenging Ward Churchill's 'Pacifism As Pathology'". The 2007 edition published by AK Press includes a preface by Derrick Jensen. A third edition was published in 2017 by PM Press with updates by Churchill and Ryan, and a foreword by Dylan Rodríguez.

Agents of Repression (1988), co-authored by Jim Vander Wall, describes what the authors said was a secret war against the Black Panther Party and American Indian Movement carried out during the late 1960s and '70s by the FBI under the COINTELPRO program. The COINTELPRO Papers (1990; reissued 2002), also co-authored with Vander Wall, examines a series of original FBI memos that detail the Bureau's activities against various leftist groups, from the U.S. Communist Party in the 1950s to activists concerned with Central American issues in the 1980s.

In Fantasies of the Master Race (1992), Churchill examines the portrayal of American Indians and the use of American Indian symbols in popular American culture. He focuses on such phenomena as Tony Hillerman's mystery novels, the film Dances with Wolves (1990), and the New Age movement, finding examples of cultural imperialism and exploitation. Churchill calls author Carlos Castaneda's claims of revealing the teachings of a Yaqui Indian shaman, the "greatest hoax since Piltdown Man".

Struggle for the Land (1993; reissued 2002) is a collection of essays in which Churchill chronicles what he describes as the U.S. government's systematic exploitation of Native lands and the killing or displacement of American Indians. He details Native American efforts in the 19th and 20th centuries to prevent deforestation and industrial practices such as surface mining.

Churchill's Indians Are Us? (1994), a sequel to Fantasies of the Master Race, further explores Native American issues in popular culture and politics.  He examines the movie Black Robe, the Pine Ridge Indian Reservation killings, the prosecution of Leonard Peltier, sports mascots, the Indian Arts and Crafts Act of 1990, and blood quantum laws, calling them tools of genocide. Churchill is particularly outspoken about New Age exploitations of shamanism and American Indian sacred traditions, and the "do-it-yourself Indianism" of certain contemporary authors. John P. LaVelle of the University of New Mexico School of Law published a review of Indians Are Us? in The American Indian Quarterly.  Professor LaVelle, an enrolled member of the Santee Sioux Nation, states that Indians Are Us? twists historical facts and is hostile toward Indian tribes. It was in this book that Churchill first made the assertion that the United States distributed "smallpox-infested blankets" to Indian tribes, an assertion which he repeated several times over the next decade. The assertion has been criticized as a falsification.

From a Native Son: Selected Essays on Indigenism, 1985–1995 (1996) is a collection of 23 previously published essays on Native American history, culture, and political activism. In his introduction to this book, Howard Zinn lauds "the emergence of a new generation of Native-American scholars" and describes Churchill's writing as "powerful, eloquent, unsparing of cant and deception".

Churchill's A Little Matter of Genocide (1997) is a survey of ethnic cleansing in the Americas from 1492 to the present.  He compares the treatment of North American Indians to historical instances of genocide by the Khmer Rouge in Cambodia, the Turks against Armenians, and Europeans against the Gypsies, as well as Nazis against the Poles and the Jews.

In Perversions of Justice (2002), Churchill argues that the U.S.'s legal system was adapted to gain control over Native American people. Tracing the evolution of federal Indian law, Churchill argues that the principles set forth were not only applied to non-Indians in the U.S., but later adapted for application abroad. He concludes that this demonstrates the development of the U.S.'s "imperial logic", which depends on a "corrupt form of legalism" to establish colonial control and empire.

Churchill's controversial essay on 9/11 was expanded into a book-length manuscript, published as On the Justice of Roosting Chickens: Reflections on the Consequences of U.S. Imperial Arrogance and Criminality (2003) by AK Press. The book features two other chapters, one listing US military interventions, another listing what Churchill believes to be US violations of international law.  The original essay takes the "roosting chickens" of the title from a 1963 Malcolm X speech, in which Malcolm X linked the assassination of U.S. president John F. Kennedy to the violence which Kennedy perpetuated as "merely a case of chickens coming home to roost". Churchill's essays in this book address the worldwide forms of resistance that he posits were and continue to be provoked by U.S. imperialism of the 20th and 21st centuries.

In Kill the Indian, Save the Man: The Genocidal Impact of American Indian Residential Schools (2004), Churchill traces the history of removing American Indian children from their homes to residential schools (in Canada) or Indian boarding schools (in the USA) as part of government policies (1880s–1980s) which he regards as genocidal.

Activism
Churchill has been active since at least 1984 as the co-director of the Denver-based American Indian Movement of Colorado, now an autonomous chapter of the American Indian Movement. In 1993, he and other local AIM leaders, including Russell Means, Glenn T. Morris, Robert Robideau, and David Hill, broke with the national AIM leadership, including Dennis Banks and the brothers Vernon and Clyde Bellecourt, claiming that all AIM chapters are autonomous. The AIM Grand Governing Council is based in Minneapolis and retains the name of the national group. It says that the schism arose when Means, Churchill, Glenn T. Morris and others openly supported the Miskito Indian group Misurasata, who were allied with the anti-revolutionary, CIA-backed Contras.

Journalists such as Harlan McKosato attributed the split to Means and other AIM members dividing over opposition to the Bellecourt brothers because of their alleged involvement in the execution of Anna Mae Aquash in December 1975, who was then the highest-ranking woman in AIM but had been suspected of being an informant.  It was a year in which other FBI informants had been discovered in AIM. On November 3, 1999, Means held a press conference in Denver, Colorado in which he accused the Bellecourt brothers of complicity in Aquash's death, and named three lower-level AIM members involved in her death: Arlo Looking Cloud, John Graham, and Theda Nelson Clarke. This was the first time that an AIM leader active at the time of the Aquash murder had publicly accused AIM of having been involved.

Looking Cloud and Graham were convicted of Aquash's murder in 2004 and 2010, by federal and South Dakota state juries, respectively. By then Clark was being cared for in a nursing home and was not indicted. Means attributed the split in AIM to divisions in the aftermath of Aquash's murder. The journalist Harlan McKosato said in 1999, "...her [Aquash's] death has divided the American Indian Movement..."

The schism continued, with the national AIM leadership claiming that the local AIM leaders, such as Churchill, are tools of the U.S. government used against other American Indians. The leaders of the national AIM organization, now called AIM Grand Governing Council, claim that Churchill has worked in the past as an underground counter-intelligence source for the U.S. government, for example the FBI, and local, non-Indian, police forces, to subvert the national AIM organization. Specifically, they refer to a 1993 Boulder, Colorado interview with Jodi Rave, a former columnist for the Denver Post, in which Churchill stated that he "was teaching the Rapid City Police Department about the American Indian Movement." In addition, Vernon Bellecourt accused Churchill of having 'fraudulently represented himself as an Indian' to bolster his credentials. Bellecourt said he complained to the University of Colorado about this as early as 1986.

Churchill has been a leader of Colorado AIM's annual protests in Denver against the Columbus Day holiday and its associated parade. Colorado AIM's leadership has come into conflict with some leaders in the Denver Italian-American community, the main supporters of the parade.

9/11 essay controversy

Churchill wrote an essay in September 2001 entitled On the Justice of Roosting Chickens. In it, he argued that the September 11 attacks were provoked by U.S. foreign policy. He described the role of financial workers at the World Trade Center as an "ongoing genocidal American imperialism" comparable to the role played by Adolf Eichmann in organizing the Holocaust. In 2005, this essay drew attention after Hamilton College invited Churchill to speak. This led to both condemnations of Churchill and counter-accusations of McCarthyism by Churchill and his supporters. Following the controversy, the University of Colorado interim Chancellor Phil DiStefano said, "While Professor Churchill has the constitutional right to express his political views, his essay on 9/11 has outraged and appalled us and the general public."

A documentary called Shouting Fire: Stories from the Edge of Free Speech, broadcast on HBO, prominently features Churchill's case in addressing the issues of free speech and First Amendment rights.

Honors
Honorary Doctorate of Humane Letters, Alfred University, 1992.

Art
Churchill's subjects are often American Indian figures and other themes associated with Native American Culture.  He uses historical photographs as source material for works.  In the early 1990s at Santa Fe Indian Market, Churchill protested the passage of the 1990 Indian Arts and Crafts Act. It requires that, to identify and exhibit works as being by a Native American, artists and craftsmen must be enrolled in a Native American tribe or designated by a tribe as an artisan.

Some of Churchill's pieces may infringe copyrights. For example, his 1981 serigraph Winter Attack was, according to Churchill and others, based on a 1972 drawing by the artist Thomas E. Mails. Churchill printed 150 copies of Winter Attack and sold at least one of them.  Other copies are available online for purchase. Churchill says that, when he produced Winter Attack, he publicly acknowledged that it was based on Mails's work.  The online journal Artnet mentions Churchill's artwork and the controversy surrounding its originality.

Personal life
In 1977, Churchill began living with Dora-Lee Larson. The relationship was later described in divorce documents as a common-law marriage. Larson filed for divorce in 1984 and asked to have her address kept secret because of “past violence and threats” from Churchill.

Churchill later married Marie Annette Jaimes, who also worked at the University of Colorado. Their marriage ended in 1995.

Churchill's third wife was Leah Kelly. On May 31, 2000, the 25-year-old Kelly was hit by a car and killed. Churchill has written that Kelly's death left a "crater" in his soul.

As of 2005, Churchill was married to Natsu Saito, a professor of ethnic studies.

Genealogy 
In 2003, Churchill stated, "I am myself of Muscogee and Creek descent on my father's side, Cherokee on my mother's, and am an enrolled member of the United Keetoowah Band of Cherokee Indians." In 1992, Churchill wrote elsewhere that he is one-eighth Creek and one-sixteenth Cherokee.
In 1993, Churchill told the Colorado Daily that "he was one-sixteenth Creek and Cherokee."  Churchill told the Denver Post in February 2005 that he is three-sixteenths Cherokee.

In a statement dated May 9, 2005, and posted on its website, the United Keetoowah Band said: "The United Keetoowah Band would like to make it clear that Mr. Churchill is not a member of the Keetoowah Band and was only given an honorary 'associate membership' in the early 1990s because he could not prove any Cherokee ancestry". The Band added that Churchill's claims of Keetoowah enrollment were deemed fraudulent by the United Keetoowah Band.

Two days later, the United Keetoowah Band replaced its earlier statement with the following: "Because Mr. Churchill had genealogical information regarding his alleged ancestry", and because he was willing "to assist the UKB in promoting the tribe and its causes, he was awarded an 'Associate Membership' as an honor". The Band clarified that Churchill "was not eligible for tribal membership due to the fact that he does not possess a 'Certificate of Degree of Indian Blood (CDIB)", and added that associate membership did not entitle an individual to voting rights or enrollment in the tribe. The Band's spokesperson, Lisa Stopp, stated the tribe enrolls only members with certified one-quarter American Indian blood. While the United Keetoowah Band voted to stop awarding associate memberships in 1994, the Band indicated in 2005 that Churchill still held an associate membership. In a separate interview, Ernestine Berry, a member of the tribe's council and a former member of its enrollment committee, said that Churchill had never fulfilled a promise to help the tribe.

Churchill has never asked for CDIB certification, and has said that he finds the idea of being "vetted" by the US government offensive.

In June 2005, the Rocky Mountain News published an article about Churchill's genealogy and family history. The newspaper's research "turned up no evidence of a single Indian ancestor" among 142 direct ancestors [of Churchill's] identified from records. The News reported that both Churchill's birth parents were listed as white on the 1930 census, as were all but two of his great-great-grandparents listed on previous census and other official documents. The News found that some of Churchill's accounts of where his ancestors had lived did not agree with documented records. Nevertheless, numerous members of Churchill's extended family have longstanding family legends of Indian ancestry among ancestors.

Some of Churchill's Native American critics, such as Vernon Bellecourt (White Earth Ojibwe) and Suzan Shown Harjo (Southern Cheyenne-Muscogee Creek), argue that without proof, his assertion of Native American ancestry might constitute misrepresentation and grounds for termination.

In a 2005 interview in The Rocky Mountain News, Churchill said, "I have never been confirmed as having one-quarter blood, and never said I was. And even if [the critics] are absolutely right, what does that have to do with this issue? I have never claimed to be goddamned Sitting Bull."

Blood quantum 
Churchill has responded to requests for verification of his asserted Indian heritage in various ways, including attacking the blood quantum upon which some Native American tribes establish their membership requirements.  Churchill argues that the United States instituted blood quantum laws based upon rules of descendancy in order to further goals of personal enrichment and political expediency.

In 1995, Churchill discussed his views on the blood quantum with David Barsamian in an interview:

For decades in his writings, Churchill has argued that blood quantum laws have an inherent genocidal purpose. He says:

Churchill's assertions have been raised as one of the several research-misconduct allegations that were brought against him in 2005 . He has been accused of using his interpretation of the Dawes Act to attack tribal governments that would not recognize him as a member.

Works
Books, as editor

 Re-released as 

Books, as author and co-author

 Re-released as 
 Revised and expanded edition:  

Articles
 
 First published as "Crimes Against Humanity" in  Also published under the titles "The Indian Chant and the Tomahawk Chop" and "Using Indian Names as Mascots Harms Native Americans".

 

Audio and video
Doing Time: The Politics of Imprisonment, audio CD of a lecture, recorded at the Doing Time Conference at the University of Winnipeg, September 2000 (AK Press, 2001)
Life in Occupied America (AK Press, 2003)
In a Pig's Eye: Reflections on the Police State, Repression, and Native America (AK Press, 2002)
US Off the Planet!: An Evening In Eugene With Ward Churchill And Chellis Glendinning, VHS video recorded July 17, 2001 (Cascadia Media Collective, 2002)
Pacifism and Pathology in the American Left, 2003 audio CD recorded at an AK Press warehouse in Oakland (AK Press Audio)
Z Mag Ward Churchill Audio August 10, 2003 and earlier
Churchill Speaks About Academic Freedom – Free Speech Radio News February 9, 2005
Ward Churchill Under Fire – Free Speech Radio News, February 3, 2005.
The Justice of Roosting Chickens: Ward Churchill Speaks The Pacifica Network Show, Democracy Now! from February 18, 2005, features extended Audio/Video exclusive interview with Churchill.
"A Little Matter of Genocide: Linking U.S. Aggression Abroad to the Domestic Repression of Indigenous Peoples", recorded in North Battleford, Saskatchewan, on March 19, 2005
Debate with David Horowitz and Ward Churchill at George Washington University April 6, 2006

 Video and audio (excerpt)

See also 
 List of scientific misconduct incidents
 Pretendian

References

Further reading
Brown, Thomas. "Did the U.S. Army Distribute Smallpox Blankets to Indians? Fabrication and Falsification in Ward Churchill's Genocide Rhetoric" University of Michigan, 2006. (PDF version also available.) 
Chapman, Roger. Culture Wars: An Encyclopedia of Issues, Viewpoints, and Voices, Volume 1. Armonk, New York: M. E. Sharpe, 2010. .
Croteau, Susan Ann. "But it doesn't look Indian": Objects, archetypes and objectified others in Native American art, culture, and identity. University of California, Los Angeles, 2008.

1947 births
Living people
20th-century American non-fiction writers
21st-century American non-fiction writers
Alternative Tentacles artists
Activists from Illinois
American male essayists
American non-fiction environmental writers
American political writers
G7 Welcoming Committee Records artists
American people who self-identify as being of Native American descent
Members of the American Indian Movement
People from Elmwood, Illinois
People involved in plagiarism controversies
Scholars of Marxism
University of Colorado Boulder faculty
University of Illinois at Springfield alumni
Writers from Urbana, Illinois
21st-century American male writers